The Bluefield Daily Telegraph is a newspaper based in Bluefield, West Virginia, and also covering surrounding communities in McDowell, Mercer and Monroe counties, West Virginia; and Bland, Buchanan, Giles and Tazewell counties, Virginia (including the town of Bluefield, Virginia). It publishes online Monday through Saturday. A print edition is distributed Tuesday through Saturday.

The Bluefield Daily Telegraph was launched on January 16, 1896 by long-time editor Hugh Ike Shott, who at one point controlled Bluefield's newspaper, both leading radio stations, and only television station. Nobel Prize winner John Forbes Nash Jr., a Bluefield native, worked for a time as an inserter, hand inserting sales pieces into the Bluefield Daily Telegraph before going on to a distinguished career in mathematics.

The weekly Princeton Times, covering Princeton, West Virginia, is also published at the Bluefield Daily Telegraph office. Both newspapers are owned by Community Newspaper Holdings Inc, who acquired them from The Thomson Corporation in 2000.

References

External links
 Daily Telegraph Website
 CNHI Website

Bluefield Daily Telegraph
Bluefield Daily Telegraph
Bluefield, West Virginia
Publications established in 1896
1896 establishments in West Virginia